is a passenger railway station on the Saikyō Line located in Chūō-ku, Saitama, Saitama Prefecture, Japan, operated by the East Japan Railway Company (JR East).

Lines
Some trains continue northward to  via the Kawagoe Line and southward to  via the TWR Rinkai Line. Kita-Yono Station is located 21.7 km from Ikebukuro Station. The station identification colour is blue.

Station layout
The station consists of one elevated island platform serving two tracks, with the station building located underneath. The tracks of the Tōhoku Shinkansen also run adjacent to this station, on the west side. The station is staffed.

Platforms

History
The station opened on 30 September 1985.

Passenger statistics
In fiscal 2019, the station was used by an average of 10,489 passengers daily (boarding passengers only). The passenger figures for previous years are as shown below.

Surrounding area
 Saitama Super Arena (about a 7-minute walk via an elevated walkway)
 Saitama New Urban Center
 Saitama Red Cross Hospital
 Aeon Mall Yono
 Saitama Izumi High School

See also
 List of railway stations in Japan

References

External links

 Kita-Yono Station information (JR East) 

Railway stations in Saitama Prefecture
Saikyō Line
Stations of East Japan Railway Company
Railway stations in Saitama (city)
Railway stations in Japan opened in 1985